Hunchback is a maternal effect gene and gap gene found in the egg and zygotic genome of Drosophila embryogenesis. It is activated by the maternal Bicoid morphogen gradient and determines the anterior-posterior axis within the syncytial blastoderm.  Hunchback is a Zinc finger transcription factor that coordinates the expression of other gap genes such as Krüppel, knirps, and giant.  

Hunchback protein is expressed in the neuroblasts of many insects, not just Drosophila. Maternal hunchback gene expression is not only found in insects, but also annelids and nematodes.

Reference

Drosophila melanogaster genes
Developmental genes and proteins
Morphogens